Gillian "Gilly" Carr  is a British archaeologist and academic. She currently specialises in the Holocaust and conflict archaeology, while her early career research focused on the Iron Age and Roman Archaeology. She is an associate professor and academic director in archaeology at the University of Cambridge's Institute of Continuing Education, and a fellow and director of studies in archaeology at St Catharine's College, Cambridge. In 2019, she was elected a Fellow of the Society of Antiquaries of London and of the Royal Historical Society. In 2020, she won the EAA European Heritage Prize for her work on the heritage of victims of Nazism.

Academic career
Carr is an Associate Professor in archaeology at the University of Cambridge, and academic director in archaeology at the Institute of Continuing Education (ICE). She is also a Fellow of St Catharine's College, Cambridge, a Partner of the Cambridge Heritage Research Centre, and a member of the McDonald Institute for Archaeological Research. She is also a member of the UK delegation of the International Holocaust Remembrance Alliance, and a member of the Academic Advisory Board for the UK Holocaust Memorial and Learning Centre.

Research
Carr's graduate degrees and early research was on the Iron Age and Roman Archaeology. Her current work centres on Conflict Archaeology and war heritage, especially that of World War II in Europe. Her research focuses, among other topics, on the history and legacy of the German occupation of the Channel Islands, the Nazi labor camps in the Islands and the victims of Nazism. Carr researched the German occupation of the Channel Islands and the deportation of over 200 islanders for acts of protest, defiance and resistance. This work can be seen in her website, the Frank Falla Archive. Her work on Channel Islander victims of Nazism were the subject of an exhibition titled: On British Soil: Victims of Nazi Persecution in the Channel Islands at the Wiener Holocaust Library from October 2017 to February 2018. The exhibition is a permanent online exhibition at the library. The exhibition then moved to Guernsey Museum in 2019. 

Carr has also researched the material culture of the Channel Islanders deported to internment camps in Germany during the Second World War. She has published over 70 journal articles and books on her research. She is one of the 12 members of the UK delegation to the International Holocaust Remembrance Alliance.

Awards and honours
In 2016,  Carr was a recipient of the Cambridge University's Vice-Chancellor Awards for Impact. On 10 October 2019, Carr was elected as a Fellow to the Society of Antiquaries of London. She was also elected a Fellow of the Royal Historical Society (FRHistS) in 2019. In 2020, she was awarded the EAA European Heritage Prize.

Select publications

Journals
Carr, G. (2015). ‘Have you been offended? Holocaust memory in the Channel Islands at HMD 70. Holocaust Studies: a Journal of Culture and History. 22(1): 44-64. DOI: 10.1080/17504902.2015.1103026
Carr, G. (2016). ‘Illicit Antiquities’? The Collection of Nazi militaria in the Channel Islands. World Archaeology48(1). DOI: 10.1080/00438243.2016.1152196
Carr, G. and Sturdy Colls, C. 2016. "Taboo and Sensitive Heritage: Labour camps, burials and the role of activism in the Channel Islands", International Journal of Heritage Studies 22 (9): 702-715. 

Carr, G. (2017). The Small Things of Life and Death: an exploration of value and meaning in the material culture of Nazi camps. International Journal of Historical Archaeology. DOI 10.1007/s10761-017-0435-0
Carr, G. (2019) The Jew and the Jerrybag: the lives of Hedwig Bercu and Dorothea Le Brocq. Journal of Holocaust and Genocide Studies. Vol. 33(2).

Books
Carr, G. 2009. Occupied Behind Barbed Wire. Jersey Heritage.
Carr, G. and Mytum, H. (eds) 2012. Cultural Heritage and Prisoners of War: Creativity Behind Barbed Wire. New York: Routledge.
Mytum, H. and Carr, G. (eds) 2013. Prisoners of War: Archaeology, Memory and Heritage of 19th and 20th Century Mass Internment. Springer.
Carr, G. 2014. Legacies of Occupation: Archaeology, Heritage and Memory in the Channel Islands. Springer.
Carr, G., Wilmott, L. and Sanders, P. 2014. Protest, Defiance and Resistance in the German Occupied Channel Islands, 1940-1945. Bloomsbury Academic.
Carr, G. and Reeves, K. (eds.) 2015. Heritage and Memory of War: Responses from small islands. Routledge: New York.
Carr, G. 2019. On British Soil. McDonald Institute.
Carr, G. 2019. Victims of Nazism in the Channel Islands: A legitimate Heritage? Bloomsbury Academic.
Carr, G. 2020. Nazi Prisons in the British Isles. Pen and Sword.
Carr, G. and Pistol, R. (eds). 2022. (forthcoming). British Internment and the Internment of Britons: Second World War Camps, History and Heritage. Bloomsbury Academic.

See also
 Alderney camps

References

External links
Frank Falla Archive—Channel Islands
Wiener Holocaust Library

Fellows of the Society of Antiquaries of London
21st-century archaeologists
Living people
British women archaeologists
Women classical scholars
Year of birth missing (living people)
Fellows of St Catherine's College, Oxford
Historians of the Holocaust
Academics of the Institute of Continuing Education
Fellows of the Royal Historical Society